Richard Marshall Merkin (1938 – September 5, 2009) was an American painter, illustrator and arts educator. Merkin's fascination with the 1920s and 1930s defined his art and shaped his identity as a professional dandy. Many of his works depict the interwar years, painting narrative scenes in bright colors of jazz musicians, film stars, writers, and sports heroes. Merkin was as well known for his outré sense of clothing style and collections of vintage pornography (in particular Tijuana bibles) as he was for his painting and illustration work.

Biography 
Merkin was born in Brooklyn, New York, in 1938, and held an undergraduate degree in fine art from Syracuse University in 1960, a Master's Degree in art from Michigan State University in 1961, and Master of Fine Arts in painting from the Rhode Island School of Design (RISD) in 1963. In 1962–63 he received a Louis Comfort Tiffany Foundation Fellowship in Painting and, in 1975, the Richard and Hinda Rosenthal Foundation Award from the National Institute of Arts and Letters.

Merkin began teaching at RISD in 1963 and remained there for 42 years, during which time he built his reputation in New York. After he moved back to New York in 1967, he commuted every week to RISD to teach painting and drawing. At RISD, Merkin was loved and revered. One alum described him as "fearless beyond measure." Some notable students Merkin taught at RISD include Chris Frantz and Tina Weymouth of the band Talking Heads and Martin Mull.

Before Merkin was well known as an artist, his newfound friend Peter Blake featured him on the cover of the Beatles' Sgt. Pepper's Lonely Hearts Club Band (1967), on the top row between Fred Astaire and a 'Vargas Girl'. Four decades later, Merkin stated of his experience:I went to England in 1966 ... and I got to meet a lot of artists that I enormously admired: David Hockney, Peter Blake, R. B. Kitaj ...

I spent that summer in London, and I became a close friend of Peter Blake ... [S]ix months later, I got a photograph in the mail of the cover of Sgt. Pepper's ... The photograph of me comes from a very early exhibition catalogue of mine ...

I sold the photograph ... for [probably] $200. That photograph would be worth $10,000 now!

People say to me, "Didn't you love the Beatles?" I'd say, "... I didn't give a goddamn about the Beatles!" I loved Bill Evans, I love Bobby Short. Now I like [Sgt. Pepper's], it's grown on me over time.Merkin was briefly featured in a party scene in the 1974 film The Great Gatsby.

Beginning in 1986, Merkin was a contributing editor for Vanity Fair. Starting in 1988, he was a regular contributor of illustrations to The New Yorker, as well as Harper's and The New York Times Sunday magazine. From 1988–1991, he wrote a monthly style column called "Merkin on Style" for Gentlemen's Quarterly.
Merkin also designed several album covers for the jazz record label Chiaroscuro Records for artists such as Mary Lou Williams, Ruby Braff, and Ellis Larkins.

Merkin died on September 5, 2009, at his home in Croton-on-Hudson, New York, after a long illness. He was 70 years old.
He was survived by his wife Heather Merkin.

Merkin's career at The New Yorker spanned twenty years, three covers, and nearly three hundred illustrations.
Merkin is represented in the permanent collections of the Museum of Modern Art, The Smithsonian Institution, Brooklyn Museum and the Whitney Museum, among others.

Style 
Merkin was known for his dandy sensibility. He told The New York Times, "I deplore fashion. ... What I like is style." In 1986, Merkin told the Daily News Record, a fashion publication: "Dressing, like painting, should have a residual stability, plus punctuation and surprise ... Somewhere, like in Krazy Kat, you've got to throw the brick." Upon his death, his friend, menswear designer Alan Flusser said of him, 

Merkin's friend, the writer Tom Wolfe wrote:  

The New Yorker noted that Merkin

Works

Bibliography 
 1967 – '‘The Stuff That Dreams Are Made Of‘ Catalogue of exhibition held at the Byron Gallery, Madison Avenue, New York. 
 1968 – Jazz Age: As Seen Through the Eyes of Ralph Barton, Miguel Covarrubias & John Held, Jr, RISD art exhibition catalog with introduction by Richard Merkin featuring writing and works Ralph Barton, Miguel Covarrubias, John Held Jr
 1969 – On Art and Perfume or Did Mondrian Use Masking Tape? M.I.T. Office of Publications, 1969. Exhibition catalog, Hayden Gallery, M.I.T., November 7 to December 2, 1969.
 1979 – Velvet Eden - The Richard Merkin Collection of Erotic Photography, by Richard Merkin and Bruce McCall. Merkin was also an avid collector of vintage pornography, and part of his collection was published in this book.
 1992 – Better Days Recent Paintings By Richard Merkin, written by Tom Wolfe and Richard Merkin (published by Helander Gallery)
 1993 – Memoirs of a Woman of Pleasure, written by John Cleland and cover illustration By Richard Merkin
 1995 – Leagues Apart: The Men and Times of the Negro Baseball Leagues, by Larry Ritter and illustrated by Richard Merkin
 1997 – Tijuana Bibles: Art and Wit in America's Forbidden Funnies, 1930s-1950s, written by Bob Adelman, Richard Merkin and Art Spiegelman

Notable Exhibitions 
 1962 – Boston Arts Festival
 1963 – DeCordova Museum
 1964 – Rhode Island Arts Festival
 1964 – DeCordova Museum
 1965 – DeCordova Museum
 1965 – Obelisk Gallery, Boston
 1967–1968 – Whitney Museum of American Art
 1967 – Byron Gallery, Madison Avenue, New York between February 15 – March 11, 1967.
 1979 – Gallery Camino Real, Florida
 2004 – Solo exhibition, Gallery 444, San Francisco
 2010 – Solo exhibition, Garrison Art Center
 2010 – Big Paper Winter, group exhibition, Woodward Gallery

References

External links
 Carrie Haddad Gallery – biography and images of Merkin's works
 Richard Merkin Collection from the General Collection, Beinecke Rare Book & Manuscript Library, Yale University.

1938 births
2009 deaths
20th-century American Jews
20th-century American painters
21st-century American Jews
21st-century American painters
21st-century American male artists
American male painters
Artists from Brooklyn
GQ (magazine)
Harper's Magazine people
Michigan State University alumni
Modern painters
The New York Times people
The New Yorker people
Painters from New York City
Rhode Island School of Design alumni
Rhode Island School of Design faculty
Syracuse University alumni
Vanity Fair (magazine) people
20th-century American male artists